The term Other White is a classification of ethnicity in the United Kingdom and has been used in documents such as the 2011 UK Census to describe people who self-identify as white (chiefly European) persons who are not of the English, Welsh, Scottish, Romani or Irish ethnic groupings.

The category  does not comprise a single ethnic group but is instead a method of identification for white people who are not represented by other white census categories. This means that the Other White group contains a diverse collection of people with different countries of birth, languages and religions. In 2011, the Scottish Government introduced the category White Polish to differentiate Polish Britons, and Polish residents, living in Scotland from this broad grouping.

The categorisation was primarily intended to cover people with ancestry from Continental Europe, with the largest represented ethnic groups being Poles (except in Scotland since 2011), Germans, Romanians, Italians and the French. It also appears that people with European ancestry (or who otherwise identify as white), born outside of the continent, are significantly represented in the White Other category. In 2001, the United States, South Africa and Australia were in the top ten birthplaces, together representing over 15 percent of the category.

Along with White British and White Irish, the category does not appear in Northern Ireland, where only one single "White" classification was presented to respondents.

According to the 2021 United Kingdom census, those identifying as Other White in England & Wales enumerated 3,667,997, or 6.2% of the population.

Demographics

Birthplace
In the 2001 UK Census, the majority of people living in England and Wales ticking the 'Other White' ethnic group specified their ethnicity as European. Four out of five of the 'Other White' category (i.e. not British or Irish) were born overseas. A
third were born in a Western European country other than the UK, and one in seven were born in an Eastern European country.

Outside of Europe, countries derived from former British colonies such as the United States, South Africa and Australia were among the top ten birthplaces (which included the UK itself). This suggested that, in 2001, significant numbers of American Britons, South African Britons, and Australian Britons, such as those born abroad to British parents and returned to the UK as minors, identified as White Other. It may also be that those who identify as white Americans, white South Africans, or white Australians have migrated to the country as adults.

According to 2016 ONS Estimates, Other Whites enumerated 4,167,000, or 6.3% of the population in the United Kingdom. However their numbers, in line with a slight population decline in Polish and Romanian citizens in Britain, fell to 3,667,997 in England & Wales at the 2021 United Kingdom census.

Economic status
The Other White group is largely of working age, with only one in ten aged over 65 and one in seven under 16 at the time of the 2001 census. This does vary according to the stated country of birth, with people born in the UK being disproportionately young. Polish and Italian respondents had a larger proportion of over 65s, which reflects the migration of Poles and Italians to Britain after the Second World War.

In 2019, the Other White group had a median hourly pay of £11.54 (8% less than the White British group).

In 2021, the Other White group had an employment rate of 82% - the highest in England, Scotland and Wales.

According to a 2022 Civitas report, Other White citizens have average wealth or assets of £53,200.

Religion
A wide number of religions are represented in the Other White group. In the census of 2011, the largest faith group, 63 per cent, identified themselves as Christian, with 16 per cent defining themselves as without religion, nine per cent as Muslims, and two per cent as Jewish.

Detailed breakdown

See also 
Albanians in the United Kingdom
Americans in the United Kingdom
Australians in the United Kingdom
Austrians in the United Kingdom
Baltic people in the United Kingdom
Bulgarians in the United Kingdom
Canadians in the United Kingdom
Classification of ethnicity in the United Kingdom
Czechs in the United Kingdom
Dutch people in the United Kingdom
British Jews
Germans in the United Kingdom
Greeks in the United Kingdom
Hungarians in the United Kingdom
Italians in the United Kingdom
History of the Jews in the United Kingdom
Kosovans in the United Kingdom
New Zealanders in the United Kingdom
Poles in the United Kingdom
Portuguese in the United Kingdom
Romanians in the United Kingdom
Russians in the United Kingdom
Scandinavian migration to Britain
Serbs in the United Kingdom
Slovenes in the United Kingdom
South Africans in the United Kingdom
Spaniards in the United Kingdom
Swedes in the United Kingdom
Turkish people in the United Kingdom

References 

Ethnic groups in the United Kingdom
White culture in the United Kingdom